Nisthar Cassim is a senior journalist and the editor of the Daily FT in Sri Lanka, a national English-language daily newspaper focusing business, finance and economic issues.

He was formerly the editor of The Daily Mirror and The Bottom Line.

Early years

Born on August 8, 1967 as the fifth child to Lafir and Huzaima Cassim in a family of six children, Nisthar started his education at Carey College, Colombo.

While in Carey College, he captained the cricket teams in all age groups but lost the opportunity of heading the under -19 team as he moved on to Wesley College, Colombo for higher studies.

Journalist

Sharpening his hobby in to his career, Nisthar joined “Sun” newspaper when he was just 21 to start a long and steady career as a Journalist.

The Scribed Trail

 1988 - Sun Newspaper of “Dawasa” Newspaper Group - Trade & Shipping
 1991 - The Island Newspaper of Upali Group - overseeing the business pages, commenced the shipping segment
 1992–1994 - handling overall media for Sri Lanka Expo 1992 & Expo 1994
 1995 – director-publicity of Federation of Chambers of Commerce & Industry of Sri Lanka
 1996/97 - business development manager - Expo International Singapore
 1997-July - Daily News - business section
 1999 July - 2005/6 deputy editor Business Daily Mirror, Wijeya Newspapers Ltd
 2006 March - July 2007 - editor-in-chief Daily Mirror, Wijeya Newspapers Ltd
 2007 August to 2009 October - managing editor, The Bottom Line, Rivira Media Corporation
 2009 October to date, editor, Daily Financial Times (Daily FT), Wijeya Newspapers Ltd

Awards and honours

  The first ‘Business Journalist Of The Year’ award by the Editors’ Guild Of Sri Lanka.
  Honoured with a ‘Global Commerce Excellence‘ Medal at the “Global Commerce Excellence Awards” held on December 13, 2011[

The Daily FT
Daily FT, or the Daily Financial Times, a daily business newspaper published in Colombo, Sri Lanka, by Wijeya Newspapers Ltd, is the biggest milestone in Cassim's career. He has served as editor from its inception.

 Nisthar Cassim interviews Dr. Philip Kotler in an Exclusive Interview.

References

Asian newspaper editors
Sri Lankan journalists
Sri Lankan Muslims
Living people
1967 births
Alumni of Carey College, Colombo